Louise de Coligny-Châtillon (1881–1963) was a French aviator.

Biography

1881 births
1963 deaths
French women aviators